The 2021 Big East women's basketball tournament took place March 5 to 8, 2021, at Mohegan Sun Arena in Uncasville, Connecticut. UConn won their 19th title, receiving the conference's automatic bid to the 2021 NCAA tournament.

Seeds

Schedule

Bracket

* denotes overtime period

See also
 2021 Big East men's basketball tournament

References

External links
Big East Tourney Central

Big East women's basketball tournament
College basketball tournaments in Connecticut
Sports competitions in Uncasville, Connecticut
Big East tournament